The Errázuriz family in Chile was founded by Francisco Javier Errázuriz Larraín, who was born in Aranaz, Navarra, Spain, and immigrated to Chile in 1735. His descendants include four presidents of Chile and several prelates of the Catholic Church.

Sources 

He was born on February 3, 1711 Aranaz, Navarra, Spain. He was son of Lorenzo de Errázuriz y Vergara  and Micaela Larrain y Cordova, both of Navarra. He died in Santiago de Chile, September 8, 1767.

He married in the cathedral church in 1739 with María Loreto de Madariaga, daughter of Official Treasurer of the Royal Treasury of the Kingdom of Chile, Francisco Madariaga and Aris Arrieta. The children of the marriage Errázuriz Madariaga were six women and four men.

Arrival in Chile 

In 1733 he came to Lima, Peru and 1735 to Chile by his uncle 'Santiago Larraín, which had been eradicated and was a prosperous merchant overseas. Introduced Errázuriz quickly Santiago society of the time.

 His children i) Francisco Javier de Errázuriz Madariaga born on April 23, 1744 and married Rosa Martinez and Aldunate Guerrero with whom he had 14 children, of which twelve children reached adulthood. It is the only one who had descent.ii) María del Carmen de Errázuriz Madariaga born in 1745 and  she was married with corregidor Luis Manuel de Zañartu, they had two daughters and both were nuns.iii) José Antonio de Errázuriz Madariaga born on September 14, 1747, he was priest . iv) Francisca de Errázuriz Madariaga born in 1748, she died very young. v) María de Errázuriz Madariaga born in 1749, she died very young vi) María Dolores de Errázuriz Madariaga born in 1750, she died very young. vii) Domingo de Errázuriz Madariaga born in 1754, he was priest .viii) Santiago de Errázuriz Madariaga born in 1755 and married with Juana de Dios de Elzo y Ureta, without succession .ix) Rosa de Errázuriz Madariaga born in 1756, she was nun . x') María Loreto de Errázuriz Madariaga born in 1760, she died very young .

His descendants include four presidents of Chile:
 Fernando Errázuriz Aldunate, 1831
 Federico Errázuriz Zañartu ,1871 to 1876
 Federico Errázuriz Echaurren, 1896 to 1901
 Germán Riesco Errázuriz, 1901 to 1906

See also
History of Chile

References

External links

Genealogical chart of Errázuriz family 

1711 births
Chilean people of Basque descent
Errázuriz family
Roman Catholic families